Luis Ricardo Llontop Godeau (born 2 October 1985) is a Peruvian footballer who plays as a goalkeeper for Universitario de Deportes in the Torneo Descentralizado.

He is currently studying Business Administration in a Peruvian university.

Honours

Club
Universitario de Deportes
 Apertura: 2008
 Torneo Descentralizado (2): 2009, 2013

References

External links 

1985 births
Living people
Footballers from Lima
Peruvian footballers
Club Universitario de Deportes footballers
Peruvian Primera División players
Association football goalkeepers